Tomás Carbonell Lladó (born 7 August 1968) is a former professional tennis player from Spain.

Carbonell won 2 singles and 22 doubles titles on the ATP Tour in his career. He won French Open in 2001 in mixed doubles with Virginia Ruano Pascual and twice reached the semifinals of the French Open in men's doubles, in 1999 with Pablo Albano, and in 2000 with Martín García. Carbonell reached his highest singles rating of World No. 40 on 15 April 1996, and his highest doubles ranking of World No. 22 on 9 October 1995. He retired from the tour in 2001.

Junior Grand Slam finals

Doubles: 2 (2 titles)

ATP career finals

Singles: 4 (2 titles, 2 runner-ups)

Doubles: 32 (22 titles, 10 runner-ups)

ATP Challenger and ITF Futures Finals

Singles: 6 (2–4)

Doubles: 11 (8–3)

Performance timelines

Singles

Doubles

Mixed doubles

External links
 
 
 

1968 births
Living people
Tennis players from Catalonia
French Open champions
Spanish male tennis players
Tennis players from Barcelona
US Open (tennis) junior champions
Wimbledon junior champions
Tennis players at the 1996 Summer Olympics
Grand Slam (tennis) champions in mixed doubles
Grand Slam (tennis) champions in boys' doubles
Olympic tennis players of Spain